The Avenues (also referred to and often known as Avenues Mall) is a two-level regional shopping mall located on the southside of Jacksonville, Florida, and opened in 1990 on the Interstate 95 corridor, and is off exit 339 at the intersection of U.S. 1 (Philips Highway) and Southside Boulevard. The mall, managed by Simon Property Group, which manages 25% of it, has a parking deck on the northwestern side. Its anchor stores are Belk, Dillard's, Forever 21, and JCPenney. Other stores located at the mall include Aldo, H&M, LOFT, BoxLunch, Build-A-Bear Workshop, MAC, LUSH Fresh Handmade Cosmetics, Pandora, and  Le Macaron French Pastries.

History 

The mall opened on September 26, 1990 with JCPenney, Maison Blanche (originally slated to open as May-Cohen's/May Florida), and Sears, followed by the opening of Dillard's (first proposed as Ivey's, which was purchased on June 4) in 1991, along with another at Cool Springs Galleria. Furthermore, Parisian was dedicated in 1994, which was also done in that same year at Cool Springs and a year later at the brand new Seminole Towne Center. Maison Blanche changed twice-first to Gayfers in early 1992 and then Belk in late 1998.

A major renovation in 2005 featured a new entrance with stained glass, neutral paint colors to complement Italian limestone on the ground floor, replacing restrooms, ceilings, lighting, benches, lounge chairs, modernizing the glass elevator, and a new children's play area. Nearly $10.5 million was spent and the changes were completed in April.

On August 2, 2006, Saks Incorporated announced an agreement to sell its Parisian specialty department store business to Belk, Inc. Shortly thereafter, the Avenues Parisian store was briefly closed and converted into the men's and children's store, with the women's departments staying in the existing store, where Belk consolidated all of its departments in February 2010.

Since 2010, the mall has increasingly faced struggles due to marginalization from St. Johns Town Center and several long-time tenants vacating due to the ongoing retail apocalypse. Most of the mall's higher-end stores have moved to St. John's Town Center such as Gap, Banana Republic, Abercrombie & Fitch, Oakley, Pottery Barn, Ann Taylor, Williams-Sonoma, and Coach. Others have gone out of business or left the market such as Brookstone, The Body Shop, New York & Company, Justice, Skechers, Yankee Candle, Disney Store, Teavana, Gymboree, Jos. A. Bank, and The Walking Company among others.

On November 18, 2010, Forever 21 opened its doors in the location formerly occupied by the Belk Men and Kids store. This is Forever 21's second-largest location in the country and largest in the entire state of Florida, at 116,000 square feet (at the time, the space represented 8.8% of the mall's 1.1 million square feet).

H&M opened a two-story store at the mall on September 6, 2012.

In early 2014, Buffalo Wild Wings opened on the second floor.

On August 31, 2019, Sears announced that it would be closing this location as part of a plan to close 85 stores nationwide. The store closed in December 2019.

Current anchor stores
 Dillard's 
 Forever 21 
 JCPenney 
 Belk 
 Furniture Source

Former anchor stores
 Maison Blanche (became Gayfers)
 Gayfers (became Belk)
 Parisian (became Belk Men's, Children's and Home)
 Belk Men's, Children's and Home (became Forever 21)
 Sears  (now Furniture Source)

References

Shopping malls in Florida
Simon Property Group
Economy of Jacksonville, Florida
Buildings and structures in Jacksonville, Florida
Shopping malls established in 1990
Tourist attractions in Jacksonville, Florida
Southside, Jacksonville
1990 establishments in Florida